Jules Van Nuffel (21 March 1883 – 25 June 1953) was a Belgian priest, musicologist, composer, and a renowned expert on religious music.

Biography 
Born on 21 March 1883 in Hemiksem, Belgium, Van Nuffel studied at the Grand Seminary of Mechelen for the priesthood, in addition to piano, violin, organ, harmony and counterpoint. He was ordained priest  by Cardinal Mercier on 25 May 1907.  As a cantor at Mechelen Cathedral, he founded the cathedral choir, and directed it until 1949. In this connection, he collaborated with the organist at the cathedral, the renowned Flor Peeters. Also, from 1918 until his death (in Wilrijk, Belgium), on 25 June 1953, Van Nuffel directed the Lemmens Institute in Leuven.

Composer 
A nationally prominent composer of liturgical works (though little known outside his native land), Van Nuffel numbered among his favorite composers Bach, Wagner and Debussy. The numbering of the psalms, which he composed for the liturgy, follows the Latin Psalter.

One of his crowning achievements was the creation of the Nova Organi Harmonia. This was an eight-volume collection of Gregorian accompaniments, composed by Van Nuffel himself, along with Peeters, Jules Vyverman, Marinus de Jong, and other professors at the Lemmens Institute. The Nova Organi Harmonia was reprinted in many editions after World War II.

Works 
 Christus vincit, for four-part male voice choir
 Ave Maria, for four-part choir
 Missa Paschalis ad 2 voces æquales, for soprano/alto or tenor/baritone and organ (n.d.)
 Super flumina Babylonis (Psalm 136), op. 25 (1916), for four-to-six-part choir and organ (or orchestra)
 Missa in honorem S.S. Cordis Jesu, op. 28, for four-to-six-part choir and organ
 Statuit ei Dominus, op. 30 (1924), for four-to-six-part choir and organ (or orchestra)
  (Psalm 125), op. 32 (1926), for four-to-seven-part choir and organ
 Ecce sacerdos magnus, op. 34 (1926), for six-part choir and organ
 Josephsmesse, for three-part female choir
 Domine, ne in furore tuo arguas me (Psalm 6), op. 44 (1935)
 Laetatus sum (Psalm 121), op. 45 (1935), for four-part choir
 Voce mea ad Dominum clamavi  (Psalm 141), op. 47 (1935) for eight-part choir
 Dominus regnavit (Psalm 92), op. 49 (1935) for four-to-six-part choir and organ
 Ad te Dominum cum tribularer clamavi (Psalm 119), op. 50 (1936)
 Ad te levavi oculos meus (Psalm 122), op. 51 (1935)
 Te Deum, op. 62 (1944) for choir, brass ensemble and organ

References

Sources

External links 
 
 Website about Jules Van Nuffel (1883–1953), a website (in Dutch and English) about the composer including a biography, overview of works and media references
 Nova Organi Harmonia
 

1883 births
1953 deaths
Belgian musicologists
Belgian classical composers
Belgian male classical composers
20th-century classical composers
Choral composers
Musicians from Antwerp
20th-century musicologists
20th-century Belgian male musicians